Golem is a German extreme death metal band. They took part in the 2007 Chronical Moshers Open Air festival. They should not be confused with a 1970s progressive rock band from Germany with the same name.

History
The band was formed in 1989, in Buckow in Brandenburg (then still in East Germany). Two of the members died in automobile accidents, in 1992 Max Grützmacher and in 1993 Jens Malwitz. The band was re-formed and received for their debut album a contract with the East German label Invasion Records. After that label stopped producing records, they were without a contract again, but they were able to get another contract through the German label Nuclear Blast.

Members

Current lineup
Andreas Hilbert - Guitar, Vocals
Rainer Humeniuk - Bass
Erik Krebs - Drums 
Carsten May - Guitar

Past members
Max Grützmacher - Bass (died 1992) 
Jens Malwitz - Guitar (died 1993) 
Michael Marschalk - Drums 
Rico Spiller - Bass
Ruben Wittchow - Drums

Discography
Visceral Scab Demo, 1991  
Visceral Scab Single, 1992  
Recall the Day of Incarnation Demo, 1993  
Eternity: The Weeping Horizons Full-length, 1996 
The 2nd Moon Full-length, 1998
Dreamweaver Full-length, 2004

External links
Official website
 

German death metal musical groups
Musical groups established in 1989
Nuclear Blast artists